Max Tidof (born 1960 in Polch) is a German actor.

Life 
Born 1960 in Polch, he grew up in Hamburg and moved to Munich in 1979 where he started acting in the Theater.

His first experiences in TV he made 1983 with the famous German TV series Rote Erde. This series was followed by many films in television and cinema.

One of his biggest successes was the role Ari Leschnikoff in the German movie Comedian Harmonists which won many awards.

In 1994-1995 he lived three months in Australia to shoot three episodes of the Australian series The Feds (Terror, Betrayal, Deadfall)

Max Tidof is one of Germany's most versatile actors.

Family 

Since 1996 Max Tidof is married to Lisa Seitz, they are living in Munich together with their daughter Luzie.

Selected filmography
 Rote Erde (1983, TV series)
 Forget Mozart (1985), as Mozart
  (1987, TV film), as Konrad Stromberg 
 Who's Afraid of Red, Yellow and Blue (1991), as Matthias Bamuscher
 Making Up! (1993), as Mark
 Ludwig 1881 (1993), as Josef Kainz
 Burning Life  (1994), as Pauli
 Surprise!  (1995, Short)
 Comedian Harmonists (1997), as Ari Leschnikoff
  (2004), as Pfarrer
 Reality XL  (2012), as Robin Spector

References

External links 
 
 Max-Tidof.com
 

1960 births
Living people
People from Mayen-Koblenz
German male film actors
German male television actors
20th-century German male actors
21st-century German male actors